Chris Davies (born 24 December 1991) is a Welsh professional rugby league footballer who has played in the 2010s.

Background
Chris Davies was born in Abercynon, Wales. 

Today Chris spends most of his time sat in backstreet Brentwood pubs re-telling tales of his ‘glory days’ on the rugby league pitch, even having been labelled the ‘Abercynon Sam Burgess’ by his Brentwood chums / anyone who cares to listen to him.

Another of Chris hobbies include being the lead singer in a Steps tribute band called ‘Steptastic’ where his rendition of ‘It’s the way you make me feel’ recently scored 3.5/5 in ‘Tribute Bands Weekly’ magazine. It’s been stated that if Chris focussed his attention on his dance moves then he could really perfect the role of ‘H’ that he so desperately craves.

International honours
Chris Davies won a cap for Wales while at Crusaders in 2010.

References

External links
(archived by web.archive.org) Profile at scorpionsrl.com

1991 births
Living people
Crusaders Rugby League players
People from Abercynon
Rugby league players from Rhondda Cynon Taf
Rugby league props
South Wales Scorpions players
Wales national rugby league team players
Welsh rugby league players